Paritrana, meaning, "to bring relief from the cause of distress," in Sanskrit, is the former name of a Indian political party later renamed to Lok Paritran. The party was formed in February 2006 by a group of six graduates from IIT Bombay and IIT Kanpur. It plans to contest in the next assembly elections and then stand for parliament. 
The founders of the political party are graduates of Indian Institutes of Technology (who chose to give up careers in their fields of study and follow their inner voice which told them that 'they should invest their efforts in the country rather than making their pockets heavier'. 
The entire core team including all the party members is Chandrashekhar (president), B.Tech, computer science (IIT Kanpur).

This party contested in 2006 Tamil Nadu elections in 7 constituencies, but failed to pull crowd. 
It was reported that the party was split. One faction formed another party called Bharat Punarnirman Dal.

References

External links
Bharat Punarnirman Dal

Political parties in India
Political parties established in 2006